Taling Chan is a khwaeng (sub-district) in Taling Chan district, Bangkok, Thailand.

History & toponymy
The name Taling Chan means "steep bank", without knowing when it was called. It is possible that this being called, because of Khlong Chak Phra canal, the original course of Chao Phraya River that flows through the area. Excavation through the loop of Chao Phraya River during middle Ayutthaya period (corresponds to King Chairachathirat's reign). As a result, Khlong Chak Phra was followed, causing one bank to have a higher area than the opposite bank, which was assumed to be the old Chao Phraya course, became a low-lying plain and suffered from annual flooding. 

Taling Chan was formerly part of Thonburi Province before Phra Nakhon and Thonburi Provinces were merged into Bangkok in late 1972. Since then, Taling Chan has been fully sub-district and district status of Bangkok.

Geography
Taling Chan is the northernmost and northeastern part of the district, with total area of 5.381 km2 (agricultural area 430.75 rai or 170.25 acres).

The geography of the area is mostly lowland (mostly in the north and east of the area adjacent the canal), therefore often faced with floods every year (during the months from October to November).

Taling Chan is bounded by other sub-districts (from north clockwise): Wat Chalo in Amphoe Bang Kruai of Nonthaburi Province (Khlong Maha Sawat is a borderline), Bang Phlat in Bang Phlat District (Khlong Bangkok Noi is a borderline), Khlong Chak Phra in its district (Chak Phra Road is a borderline), Chim Phli in its district (Southern Railway Line is a borderline), respectively.

Administration
Taling Chan consists of 15 villages (muban).

Temples
There are four Buddhist temples in Taling Chan
Wat Kai Tia
Wat Chaiyaphrueksamala
Wat Nakhon Pa Mak
Wat Noi Nai

Transportation
Taling Chan can be reached by car via Borommaratchachonnani, Chaiyaphruek, Chak Phra, and Suan Phak Roads, and can also be accessed via Southern Railway, both from Bangkok Railway Station and Bang Sue Grand Station.

Waterways are still the main routes for transporting agricultural products to Pak Khlong Talat.

References

Taling Chan district
Subdistricts of Bangkok